Code page 1098 (CCSID 1098) (also known as CP 1098, IBM 01098, is a code page used  to write Urdu in Iran.

Character set
The following table shows code page 1098. Each character is shown with its equivalent Unicode code point. Only the second half of the table (code points 128–255) is shown, the first half (code points 0–127) being the same as ASCII, except for two code points:
25hex which is defined as  instead of 
2Ahex which is defined as  instead of

References

1098